János Miklósvári (born 10 April 1984) is a Hungarian professional footballer who plays for Ceglédi VSE.

Club statistics

Updated to games played as of 1 June 2014.

References
MLSZ 
HLSZ 

1984 births
Living people
Footballers from Budapest
Hungarian footballers
Association football defenders
BFC Siófok players
Ceglédi VSE footballers
BKV Előre SC footballers
Nemzeti Bajnokság I players